Kaigram is a village in Manteswar CD block in Kalna subdivision of Purba Bardhaman district of West Bengal, India.

Demographics
As per the 2011 Census of India Kaigram had a total population of 1,719, of which 881 (51%) were males and 838 (49%) were females. Population below 6 years was 177. The total number of literates in Kaigram was 1,263 (81.91% of the population over 6 years).

Education
It is the location of Kaigram High School.

External links
 Geo-Links for Kaigram

References

Villages in Purba Bardhaman district